The office of High Sheriff of Gwent was established in 1974 under section 219 of the Local Government Act 1972, replacing the shrievalty of Monmouthshire.

List of Sheriffs

See also
 High Sheriff of Monmouthshire

References

Gwent